William Sneyd may refer to:
 William Sneyd (MP for Staffordshire) (c. 1614–1695), English politician
 William Sneyd (MP for Lichfield) (c. 1693–1745), English politician
 William Sneyd (footballer), English footballer